Zhu Shizhen (1281–1344), born Zhu Wusi, was the father of Zhu Yuanzhang, the founder of the Ming dynasty. He was a native of Jurong (present-day Jurong, Jiangsu). His father, Zhu Chuyi, moved to Xuyi, Si Prefecture (present-day Xuyi, Jiangsu), and Zhu Shizhen moved again to Zhongli, Haozhou (present-day Fengyang, Anhui).

His wife was Lady Chen, posthumously Empress Chun. He had four sons — the eldest, Zhu Chongsi the Prince of Nanchang (Zhu Xinglong), the second, Zhu Chongliu the Prince of Xuyi (Zhu Xingsheng), the third, Zhu Chongqi the Prince of Linhuai (Zhu Xingzu), and the fourth was Zhu Yuanzhang the Hongwu Emperor — and two daughters — Grand Princess of Cao (mother of Li Wenzhong) and Grand Princess Taiyuan.

In 1344, there was a great drought in Huaibei, and Zhu Shizhen, Lady Chen, and Zhu Xinglong the Prince of Nanchang, died successively.

In 1363, Han Lin'er posthumously Zhu Wusi as Kai fu yi tong san si, Shang zhu guo, Lu jun guo zhong shi, Zhong shu you cheng xiang, Tai wei, and Wu guo gong. His wife, Lady Chen, was posthumously as Gong furen.

In 1368, Zhu Yuanzhang established the Ming dynasty in Nanjing and posthumously honoured Zhu Shizhen as emperor,  with the temple name Renzu (仁祖) and posthumous name Emperor Chun (淳皇帝). His tomb was Ming Imperial Mausoleum in Fengyang.

Family
Consorts and Issue:
 Empress Chun, of the Chen clan (1286–1344)
 Zhu Chongsi (Zhu Xinglong), Prince of Nanchang (1307–1344), first son
 Zhu Chongliu (Zhu Xingsheng), Prince of Xuyi (1307–1344), second son
 Zhu Chongqi (Zhu Xingzu), Prince of Linhuai (1307–1344), third son
 Zhu Chongba (Zhu Xingzong, Zhu Yuanzhang), the Hongwu Emperor (21 October 1328 – 24 June 1398), fourth son
 Grand Princess Taiyuan, first daughter
 Married Wang Qiyi
 Grand Princess of Cao (1317–1351), personal name Fonü, second daughter
 Married Li Zhen (1304–1379), and had issue (one son)

Ancestry

References

1281 births
1344 deaths
Yuan dynasty people
Ming dynasty posthumous emperors
People from Zhenjiang
People from Jurong, Jiangsu